Dryden Historic District is a national historic district located at Dryden in Tompkins County, New York.  The district consists of 44 properties encompassing the historic core of the village of Dryden.  Except for three mid-19th-century commercial buildings, the district consists of residential structures pleasantly spaced along three lined streets.  Generally they consist of -story frame structures built between 1800 and 1905.

It was listed on the National Register of Historic Places in 1984.

References

Historic districts on the National Register of Historic Places in New York (state)
Historic districts in Tompkins County, New York
National Register of Historic Places in Tompkins County, New York